The Mokpo International Football Center is a football-specific stadium and training ground in Mokpo, South Korea and was built in 2009. It has six football pitch. Two are nature grounds, three are artificial turf grounds and one ground for youth.

References

External links
 Mokpo International Football Center 
 Mokpo International Football Center 

Buildings and structures in South Jeolla Province
Mokpo
Sport in South Jeolla Province
Football venues in South Korea
Mokpo
Sports venues completed in 2009
2009 establishments in South Korea